A biker bar is a bar that is frequented by motorcyclists (bikers). Some are owned or managed by people who are friendly toward motorcyclists. Some bars and restaurants advertise that they are "biker friendly" to attract more bikers and motorcycle (bike) enthusiasts. Biker bars are patronized by people from all walks of life, including bikers, non-bikers, and motorcycle club adherents, including outlaw motorcycle clubs.

Biker socialization

Biker bars provide a place for people to congregate, socialize, network, eat, drink and celebrate. At times, biker bars may have many motorcycles parked in front of them, such as during a motorcycle rally. This provides an opportunity for bikers to socialize, compare their motorcycles, mechanical customizations and modifications, and to discuss aspects of motorcycles and motorcycling.

Many biker bars have rules on whether they allow patrons to wear "colors", many biker bars do not allow "colors" as these are used to define one's position and/or alliance to one club over another. The "No Colors" club rules have become more popular over the years as a way to reduce tension between rival club members and potential security issues.

Motorcycle clubs
Motorcycle clubs may assign a club member to remain outside of a bar to guard their motorcycles from vandalism or theft while the rest of the group congregates inside. Members of outlaw motorcycle clubs have been known to patronize biker bars. Some motorcycle clubs, including outlaw motorcycle clubs, adopt public biker bars as their club bar; as a bar that club members regularly frequent. This can provide opportunities for motorcycle clubs to meet potential prospects, or recruits, for their clubs. Motorcycle clubs may cordon off an area of a bar as reserved for their members and those that they choose to socialize with, such as other select bikers, single females and friends. This may also occur to provide club members with a vantage point to observe activity occurring in a bar and to spot potential threats. Club biker bars also provide a space for members to meet and discuss club matters, and as a means to unify the group through socialization and camaraderie. Sometimes arrangements are made between motorcycle clubs and bar managers or owners regarding the utilization of a bar in relation to the regular presence of club members.

Motorcycle club members have also performed bouncer services at times in biker bars. This can occur for several reasons, such as to protect their members or to prevent various conflicts from occurring or escalating. Sometimes club members work in unison with bouncer staff in bars, and sometimes club members are paid employees as part-time bouncers. Additionally, club members sometimes receive preferential service by bar staff, such as not having to wait in lines to get inside of a crowded bar while non-club members wait outside in a queue.

Examples of biker bars

The Rock Store is a restaurant in Cornell, California, in Malibu Canyon, that is popular with motorcyclists.
 The Ace Cafe is located on the North Circular Road in London, England, UK.
 Squires Cafe Bar is located just outside Sherburn in Elmet, a short distance from Leeds, UK.

 Cook's Corner is a bar and restaurant located in Trabuco Canyon, Orange County, California
 Dinosaur Bar-B-Que is a bar and restaurant chain in New York and New Jersey.
 The Full Throttle Saloon is located in Sturgis, South Dakota and has been described as the world's largest biker bar. The reality television series Full Throttle Saloon chronicles the daily operations of the establishment.
 Hogs and Heifers was a bar located in New York City that opened in 1992. It closed in August 2015.
 The Hurley Mountain Inn in Hurley, New York was famous for its rough and tumble biker bar scene, but then a NY State Trooper barracks was sited directly across the street and the bar settled into a tame, family-style establishment.
 Johnny's Bar in Hollister, California has been documented as being a historical biker bar.
 Neptune's Net is located in Malibu, California, and is a well known biker bar which has featured prominently in film and television. 
 Cruisers Bar & Grill is located in Post Falls, Idaho.
 Scoundrels Pub in Las Vegas, Nevada and a group of motorcycle clubs jointly sued the Las Vegas Metropolitan Police Department in January 2012, alleging violations of the constitutional rights of bikers. The lawsuit alleged that the Las Vegas police department advised bar owners to discriminate against motorcycle clubs by denying them entry into their bars.

See also
 Sturgis Motorcycle Rally
 Buffalo Chip Campground
 Types of drinking establishments

References

Bibliography

Further reading

Books
 Bike Lust: Harleys, Women, And American Society - Barbara Joans. pp. 110–111.
 The Mammoth Book of Bikers. p. 411.
 
 

Types of drinking establishment
Motorcycling subculture
 
Lists of restaurants